"Property is theft!" is a slogan coined by French anarchist Pierre-Joseph Proudhon in his 1840 book What Is Property? or, An Inquiry into the Principle of Right and of Government.

Overview 
By "property", Proudhon referred to a concept regarding land property that originated in Roman law: the sovereign right of property, the right of the proprietor to do with his property as he pleases, "to use and [to] abuse," so long as in the end he submits to state-sanctioned title. Proudhon contrasts the supposed right of property with the rights (which he considered valid) of liberty, equality, and security. Proudhon was clear that his opposition to property did not extend to exclusive possession of labor-made wealth.

In the Confessions d'un révolutionnaire Proudhon further explained his use of this phrase:

Similar phrases 

Jacques Pierre Brissot had previously written, in his Philosophical Inquiries on the Right of Property (Recherches philosophiques sur le droit de propriété et le vol), "Exclusive property is a robbery in nature." Marx would later write in an 1865 letter to a contemporary that Proudhon had taken the slogan from Warville, (a name assumed by Brissot) although this is contested by subsequent scholarship.

The phrase also appears in 1797 in the Marquis de Sade's text L'Histoire de Juliette: "Tracing the right of property back to its source, one infallibly arrives at usurpation. However, theft is only punished because it violates the right of property; but this right is itself nothing in origin but theft".

Similar phrases also appear in the works of Saint Ambrose, who taught that superfluum quod tenes tu furaris (the superfluous property which you hold you have stolen) and Basil of Caesarea (Ascetics, 34, 1–2).

Jean-Jacques Rousseau made the same general point when he wrote: "The first man who, having enclosed a piece of ground, bethought himself of saying 'This is mine', and found people simple enough to believe him, was the real founder of civil society. From how many crimes, wars, and murders, from how many horrors and misfortunes might not any one have saved mankind, by pulling up the stakes, or filling up the ditch, and crying to his fellows: Beware of listening to this impostor; you are undone if you once forget that the fruits of the earth belong to us all, and the earth itself to nobody."

Irish Marxist James Connolly referred to the socialist movement as the "Great Anti-Theft Movement of the Twentieth Century."

Criticism 
Karl Marx, although initially favourable to Proudhon's work, later criticised, among other things, the expression "property is theft" as self-refuting and unnecessarily confusing, writing that theft' as a forcible violation of property presupposes the existence of property" and condemning Proudhon for entangling himself in "all sorts of fantasies, obscure even to himself, about true bourgeois property".

Max Stirner was highly critical of Proudhon, and in his work, The Ego and Its Own, made the same criticism of Proudhon's expression before Marx, asking, "Is the concept 'theft' at all possible unless one allows validity to the concept 'property'? How can one steal if property is not already extant? ... Accordingly property is not theft, but a theft becomes possible only through property."

Footnotes 

a.  This translation by Benjamin Tucker renders "c'est le vol" as "it is robbery", although the slogan is typically rendered in English as "property is theft".

References

External links
 

1840s neologisms
Anarchist theory
Pierre-Joseph Proudhon
Political catchphrases
French political catchphrases
Quotations from literature
Quotations from philosophy